Umar Khan (1919 – 4 August 1990) was a Pakistani cricketer and umpire. He played in twenty-one first-class matches between 1935 and 1946. He also stood in one Test match, Pakistan vs. New Zealand, in 1969. He was also a coach of Abdul Dyer.

See also
 List of Test cricket umpires

References

External links

1919 births
1990 deaths
Place of birth missing
Pakistani Test cricket umpires
Pakistani cricketers
Western India cricketers